The 1982 NCAA Division I-AA Football Championship Game was a postseason college football game between the Eastern Kentucky Colonels and the Delaware Fightin' Blue Hens. The game was played on December 18, 1982, at Memorial Stadium in Wichita Falls, Texas. The culminating game of the 1982 NCAA Division I-AA football season, it was won by Eastern Kentucky, 17–14.

The game was also known as the Pioneer Bowl, a name that had been used starting in 1971 for various NCAA playoff games held in Wichita Falls. The Colonels, making their fourth consecutive appearance in the I-AA championship game, became the first program to capture two I-AA titles, having previously won in 1979.

Teams
The participants of the Championship Game were the finalists of the 1982 I-AA Playoffs, which began with a 12-team bracket.

Eastern Kentucky Colonels

Eastern Kentucky finished their regular season with an undefeated 10–0 record (7–0 in conference). Ranked first in the final NCAA I-AA in-house poll and seeded first in the tournament, the Colonels received a first-round bye then defeated Idaho and fourth-seed Tennessee State to reach the final. This was the fourth appearance for Eastern Kentucky in a Division I-AA championship game, having won in 1979 and having lost in 1980 and 1981.

Delaware Fightin' Blue Hens

Delaware finished their regular season with a 10–1 record; its only loss was an away game at Temple. Ranked third in the final NCAA I-AA in-house poll and seeded third in the tournament, the Fightin' Blue Hens received a first-round bye then defeated Colgate and second-seed Louisiana Tech to reach the final. This was the first appearance for Delaware in a Division I-AA championship game, though the team had recently been the 1979 Division II champion before moving up to Division I-AA in 1980.

Game summary

Scoring summary

 Delaware's attempt to kick the extra point was blocked, but Eastern Kentucky was ruled offside on the play. Delaware then attempted a two-point conversion, with the ball being snapped  yards from the end zone.

Game statistics

References

Further reading

External links
 100 Years of Eastern Kentucky University Football - Part 4 (1982) via YouTube
 FCS Top Championship Game Moments - Rick Titus (72-yard punt) via YouTube

Championship Game
NCAA Division I Football Championship Games
Delaware Fightin' Blue Hens football games
Eastern Kentucky Colonels football games
American football competitions in Texas
Sports in Wichita Falls, Texas
NCAA Division I-AA Football Championship Game
NCAA Division I-AA Football Championship Game